The McLaren MP4/4, also known as the McLaren-Honda MP4/4, is one of the most successful Formula One car designs of all time. Powered by Honda's RA168E 1.5-litre V6-turbo engine and driven by teammates Alain Prost and Ayrton Senna, the car competed during the 1988 Formula One season. The design of the car was led by American engineer Steve Nichols, the full responsibility for the design of the chassis having been conferred on him by Ron Dennis. Gordon Murray, as Technical Director, had the role of liaising between the drawing office and production.

Honda had made the Constructors' Championship-winning engines of 1986 and 1987, and for 1988 they switched partners from Williams to McLaren, who had struggled with their dated TAG-Porsche engines. The engine's design and development was led by Osamu Goto. The Honda-powered MP4/4 is one of the most dominant Formula One cars ever built, winning all but one race and claiming all but one pole position in the 1988 season.

Origins

In 1987 it was becoming increasingly difficult for McLaren to compete with major manufacturer-backed teams using, effectively, a privateer engine financed in-house by TAG and built by Porsche. The Steve Nichols designed McLaren MP4/3-TAG won three races with Alain Prost finishing fourth in the drivers' championship. Prost's win in Portugal was cause for celebration as it was the Frenchman's 28th career win, taking him past the previous record of 27 wins by triple World Champion Jackie Stewart.

The car was good enough to finish second in the Constructors' Championship, secure the services of Ayrton Senna and persuade Honda to switch its engine supply deal from Williams to McLaren for the following season. 

For 1988 McLaren had secured the use of the 1.5L V6 Honda turbo engines which since late in the  season had been the best engine in Formula One. With the engines coming at the expense of Williams, who had won the previous two Constructors' Championships, a strong 1988 was possible. Team boss Ron Dennis had previously tried to secure Honda engines for his Formula 2 team and welcomed the Japanese company after four successful years with the TAG engines. 1988 was due to be the last year for the turbo engines before they were banned, so most teams were making a concerted effort to establish themselves with naturally aspirated cars. Steve Nichols went ahead with the design of the car on a pure turbo engine basis, which put the team at a potential disadvantage to their rivals.

1988 was a transition year prior to a naturally aspirated-only formula in 1989 and the regulations were framed to reward those teams that had already made the switch. Over a race distance, the MP4/4 would suffer a significant power deficit compared to its naturally aspirated rivals. The car had the luxury of being able to modulate boost, but with a fuel tank allowance of only 150 litres (naturally aspirated cars were unlimited) it meant that the team would have to go into extreme fuel conservation to get to the end of a race.

Although there was speculation that Honda would introduce their V10 engine during 1988, Ron Dennis confirmed during qualifying for the Italian Grand Prix at Monza that racing the V10 was never part of the plan for 1988. By keeping the V6 engine, Honda and McLaren also gave themselves more development time on the 1989 car, which was an evolution of the MP4/4.

With the 90° TAG V6 at their disposal and a fuel tank size of 195 litres (down from 220 litres), McLaren proved that the concept did work, with redesigned side pods also getting the treatment (only the nose section remained as a visual reminder of the MP4/2C, though it too was lower and approximately 10% smaller). The improved aerodynamics helped Prost and Stefan Johansson to be closer to the more powerful Honda-powered cars than they might have been with the older MP4/2 design, although the team was hampered by unreliability which had crept into the TAG engines which had been redesigned in 1987 to cope with the lower fuel limit and the FIA's controversial pop-off valve which restricted turbo boost to just 4.0 Bar. The team was able to build on this and, with the smaller 80° Honda V6, and a reduction in fuel tank size from 195 to 150 litres, the sleek-looking, all-new MP4/4 was produced and first appeared early in 1988. It was one of the few competing cars that year that was an all-new car; Ferrari, Lotus, Arrows, Tyrrell, and others were using updated or developed versions of their previous years' cars in order to build new cars for the 1989 season when turbocharged engines would be outlawed altogether.

Team performance

The situation improved immensely when Ayrton Senna was signed to partner Alain Prost (at Prost's suggestion) on a three-year contract. However, there were concerns after the FIA introduced a fuel regulation for the turbo-powered cars of 150 litres for a race distance. Honda's engine management team worked feverishly on the fuel consumption of the RA168E which was specially built for the reduction in turbo boost from 4.0 bar to 2.5 bar rather than upgrading the 1987 spec engine, trying to improve it in order to avoid embarrassing late-race retirements. The car appeared 'as-is' through the season, save for a few aerodynamic revisions. The car arrived at the first race in Brazil with very little pre-season testing at Imola only a week before the race, but Senna was able to put the car on pole position by half a second from surprise second-place qualifier, Nigel Mansell driving the  naturally aspirated Williams-Judd V8, with Prost qualifying third.

One feature of the MP4/4 was the driver's position. Due to the car's low-slung aerodynamics and the FIA safety rule which stated that the top of a driver's helmet had to be below an imaginary straight line drawn from the top of the roll bar to the top of the cowling, the drivers were required to be in a reclining position rather than in the conventional upright seating position of rival contemporary Grand Prix cars. Senna had absolutely no problems with the seating position. Prost, being smaller, preferred to be slightly more upright, and because of his size, the team was able to accommodate this without modification.

As the MP4/4 was a new car, it had to conform to FISA's new for 1988 safety regulations which stipulated that the driver's feet be behind the line of an imaginary front axle. Teams running cars from the previous season were able to continue to do so under the earlier regulations for which they had been designed.

Before 1988, the most dominant car seen in a single season of F1 had been McLaren's  car, the John Barnard designed MP4/2 which had won 12 of the 16 races that year driven by Prost and World Champion Niki Lauda (Lauda had defeated Prost in the Drivers' Championship by only half a point). However, the MP4/4's successes eclipsed the MP4/2 not only in wins but in qualifying performance. 1988 was an almost embarrassing walkover for McLaren, who took 15 victories from 16 races, including ten 1-2 finishes, while Prost finished 1st or 2nd in the 14 races he finished (he had 2 retirements - Britain and Italy). The car also sat on pole position in 15 of the 16 races (including a record 13 poles for Senna), locked out the front row in 12 races, and also set 10 fastest race laps. The dominant run was only interrupted once, at the Italian Grand Prix at Monza for Round 12, when Senna crashed out of the lead with only two laps remaining while lapping Jean-Louis Schlesser, who was making his first and only F1 start for Williams in place of Mansell who was suffering from chickenpox. With Prost already out after a rare engine failure, Gerhard Berger claimed an emotional victory for Ferrari just a month after the death of Ferrari founder Enzo Ferrari.

Perhaps the most telling example of the MP4/4's emphatic domination was seen at San Marino in just the second race of the season. Senna and Prost both qualified the 5.040 km (3.131 mi) Imola circuit in the 1:27s (Senna 0.7 faster than Prost) while no other driver could get below 1:30. Third on the grid was defending World Champion Nelson Piquet in his Lotus 100T, which used the same 1988 specification Honda engines as McLaren. Piquet could only qualify in 1:30.500, 3.352 seconds slower than Senna, and 2.581 seconds slower than Prost. The Lotus actually recorded faster speed trap figures (1.5 km/h faster than the McLarens) on the run to Tosa, but around the rest of the circuit the McLaren's acceleration and downforce were unmatched. Despite this, both Piquet and Lotus boss Peter Warr told the assembled media at Imola that they believed their car to be better aerodynamically, and therefore more fuel-efficient than the MP4/4. However, both McLarens had lapped the entire field, including 3rd placed Piquet, by lap 55 of the 60 lap race. The fast Imola circuit with its long periods of full-throttle racing was notoriously hard on fuel, especially for the turbo cars which had seen numerous late race retirements in recent years, and the McLarens lapping the field at the speed they did prove the aerodynamic efficiency of the car as well as the work Honda had undertaken to reduce fuel consumption. Prost and Senna's fastest laps (again the only drivers under 1:30) were 1.5 seconds faster than the next fastest, Gerhard Berger's Ferrari. Piquet's fastest lap was only the ninth fastest of the race, and some 2.8 seconds slower than Prost's fastest lap of 1:29.685. Both Prost and Senna lapped faster in the race than Piquet had qualified, putting an exclamation mark on McLaren's dominant weekend.

The car retired only four times in the season - with Prost retiring at Silverstone during a very wet British Grand Prix (handling), and at Monza for the Italian Grand Prix (engine, the only in race engine failure McLaren suffered all season), along with Senna's infamous accidents at Monaco (where he totally dominated qualifying and by lap 66 of the race had built a 50-second lead over Prost who had been stuck for 54 laps behind Berger, only to throw it away by crashing into the barriers at Portier. As he lived in Monaco, Senna went back to his home and did not contact the team until that night when he finally returned to the pits as the team was packing up, such was his disappointment), and Monza. Monaco was another example of McLaren's domination, Senna qualified 1.4 seconds faster than acknowledged Monaco master Prost, who himself was 1.2 seconds faster than third-placed Gerhard Berger in his Ferrari.

During the season both McLarens qualified for a race over one second faster than the rest of the field on six occasions (San Marino, Monaco, Germany, Portugal, Japan and Australia), while the team achieved 15 pole positions (13 for Senna and 2 for Prost) to go along with the 15 wins. Only Gerhard Berger's pole position at Silverstone prevented a perfect pole record for McLaren. Britain was the only race where neither McLaren qualified on the front row with Ferrari's Michele Alboreto qualifying 2nd, Senna, and Prost occupying the 2nd row. Britain was also the only race of the season that Ayrton Senna didn't qualify his McLaren-Honda on the front row of the grid. Prost failed to qualify on the front row four times during the season (Brazil, Detroit, Britain and Hungary). Hungary saw the worst qualifying position for a McLaren in 1988 when Prost was only 7th fastest. Senna, as usual, was on pole at the tight Hungaroring, though only 0.108 in front of Nigel Mansell's Williams-Judd. Other than at Silverstone, this was the closest any car got to knocking one of the MP4/4's off pole position.

It was during qualifying at Hockenheim in Germany, the MP4/4 set its top speed record, and the fastest speed trap of the 1988 season when both Senna and Prost achieved  on the 1.6 km long straight that took the cars into the forest. However, with the reduction in engine power from the levels of 1986 and 1987, the McLaren-Honda's top speed was  slower than the fastest speed of 1987 (Nelson Piquet in a Williams-Honda at Monza), and  slower than had been achieved in 1986 (Gerhard Berger in a Benetton-BMW, also at Monza).

At Silverstone, McLaren introduced revised aerodynamics to the MP4/4, doing away with the turbo "snorkels" (which force-fed air to the turbos) located on the top of the side pods. While this proved troublesome on the first day of qualifying, with both drivers feeling it created an imbalance in the cars, and the snorkels re-introduced for the rest of the British GP weekend, it was the last time the snorkels were seen on the MP4/4s for the rest of the season, as testing before the next round in Germany had shown the imbalance was caused by incorrect settings on the car's suspension and not by the removal of the snorkels. Team boss Ron Dennis estimated that the research and development on the revised aerodynamics had cost the team somewhere around £150,000 for something that was purely an aerodynamic gain and gave no extra horsepower to the Honda engine.

Other than the four retirements, the lowest finishing position for the MP4/4 was a 6th in Round 13 in Portugal, and 4th in the next race in Spain, with both recorded by Senna. During both races, his car was hampered by fuel readout problems which forced him to run slower than he otherwise could have in order to have enough fuel to finish. Both races were won by Alain Prost.

At the end of the season, McLaren-Honda had taken both the Constructors and Drivers' titles (Senna edging out Prost due to winning more races - only the eleven best results counted, so even though Prost scored more overall points, Senna's 8 first-place finishes to Prost's 7, meant Senna took the championship title.) McLaren-Honda, who scored a then-record 199 points in the Constructors Championship, wrapped up the Constructors title with a 1-2 finish in Belgium for Round 11 of the 16 race season, it was the team's eighth 1-2 finish of the season (Senna and Prost would finish 1-2 twice more, in Japan and Australia). The team finished the season a massive 134 points in front of 2nd placed Ferrari.

Although statistically not as successful as the MP4/4 (more because others such as Ferrari, Williams and Benetton improved rather than McLaren and Honda faltered), the 1989 car would give the team another Constructors Championship, with Prost and Senna finishing 1-2 in the Drivers' Championship.

After driving the car, Hamilton said to host Jeremy Clarkson "I love this car. It's one of the best days of my life. I finally can check off my dream of driving this car." Not surprisingly, Hamilton also noted that the car lacked grip compared to the aerodynamically more advanced McLaren MP4-25 he raced that year.

A modified car, the MP4/4B, was used as a test mule for Honda's new 3.5-litre V10 designed around the new regulations for the 1989 season banning turbocharged engines.

Chassis log history

For the 1988 season, six MP4/4 cars were moulded from carbon fibre with assistance from Hercules Aerospace. The chassis numbers, 1 through 6, were used throughout the year.
All six MP4/4 chassis still exist: Chassis #1, 4, & 6 are owned by the McLaren Group, with #1 on display at the McLaren Technology Centre and was driven at Goodwood in 2013 by Sergio Pérez. McLaren Auckland previously had chassis #4 on display for a number of years, but returned to the factory in Woking. Another, chassis #6, was on display at the National Motor Museum in Beaulieu (UK) under Prost livery. Chassis #6 was driven by Bruno Senna at Goodwood in 2009 under the Senna livery. Chassis #2 is owned by a private collector in Chicago, Illinois and has been on display at McLaren of Chicago after being driven by Bruno Senna at Interlagos in 2019. Chassis #3 was previously on loan and displayed at the Donington Grand Prix Exhibition, but was relocated and displayed at McLaren Osaka Hakko. It was relocated again to Museo y Circuito Fernando Alonso in Asturias, Spain by 2016. As of 2022, it now belongs in private ownership in the UK at Kiklo Spaces. Chassis #5 is owned by Honda and is sometimes on display at the Honda Collection Hall at Motegi and ran at Goodwood in 2014 under Marlboro livery by Takuya Izawa. Additionally, Honda own a showcar, chassis MP4/4/SSC/10 (SSC for static show car), that is occasionally put on display including the 2015 Tokyo Auto Salon and Honda Collection Hall.

Chassis history
MP4/4-01: This chassis won one race: Imola by Senna. Raced by Senna at Imola (San Marino), Monaco, and Mexico City (Mexico); was used as the spare car at Montreal (Canada), Detroit (USA), Paul Ricard (France) and Silverstone (Britain), was initially the spare car at Hockenheim (Germany) but Prost raced this car there; was then used by Prost at Hungaroring (Hungary), Spa (Belgium) and Monza (Italy). Used by Senna to set pole position at Rio, but the car failed on the line at the start of the parade lap; he used MP4/4-03 for the race instead. Was not used for testing.
MP4/4-02: This chassis won three races: Rio by Prost; and Detroit and Suzuka (Japan) by Senna. Senna won the Driver's Championship with this chassis at Suzuka. Was used as the spare car at Rio, Imola, Monaco, Mexico City, Montreal, Hungaroring, Spa, Monza, Estoril (Portugal), Jerez (Spain) and Suzuka. Prost opted to use this chassis instead of his main car at Rio, while Senna opted to do the same with this chassis at Suzuka and Adelaide; Senna also used this chassis as his main car at Detroit. Prost used this chassis to set his grid time at Mexico City. Was used at the first pre-season test at Imola.
MP4/4-03: Primary test car; only MP4/4 not to win a GP. Was originally Prost's main car at Rio but he opted to use MP4/4-02; Senna then raced this car at Rio after his main car, MP4/4-01 failed on the line at the start of the parade lap.
MP4/4-04: This chassis was used exclusively by Prost, and he won three races with it: Monaco, Mexico City, & Paul Ricard. Also raced by Prost at San Marino, Canada, Detroit and Silverstone. Used by Prost to set grid time at Hockenheim, but he opted to use the spare MP4/4-01 for the race there. Was not used for testing.
MP4/4-05: This chassis was used exclusively by Senna, and he won four races with it: Silverstone, Hockenheim, Hungaroring and Spa. Used and made available to Senna for the remainder of the season; also raced at Monza, Estoril and Jerez by Senna. Was originally Senna's race car at Suzuka and Adelaide (Australia), but he opted to use MP4/4-02 for both races. Used by Senna to set pole position time at Adelaide. Was used in one test.
MP4/4-06: This chassis was used exclusively by Prost, and he won three races with it: Estoril, Jerez, & Adelaide. Was first introduced at Estoril. Was not used in any tests.

Other
The MP4/4 was voted the greatest Formula One car of all time by a panel of Formula One engineers and designers.

It was also voted greatest race car of the 20th century by Autosport readers.

Steve Nichols has said that he was honoured to lead the McLaren design team including Matthew Jeffreys, Dave North, Bob Bell, Hugh Moran, Dave Neilson, Tim Wright, Colin Smith, Mike Lock, and Paul Merrit. He thought that the MP4/4 was the culmination of all the experience and effort of all the McLaren people who worked so hard to design, produce and race this car and that it was the perfect validation of the concept of teamwork.

Senna's MP4/4 was included in the 2001 video game Gran Turismo 3 under the aliases "F688/S" (Japanese and American NTSC-J/NTSC-U/C versions) and "Polyphony002" (European PAL version). The MP4/4 in its actual, licensed version would later reappear in Gran Turismo 7, as part of the 1.20 update.

The MP4/4 was one of three car choices in the 1988 Accolade computer game Grand Prix Circuit. The game was available for Amiga, Amstrad CPC, Apple IIGS, Commodore 64, DOS and ZX Spectrum.

The MP4/4 was released as downloadable content for the 2015 video game Forza Motorsport 6.

In F1 2017 the MP4/4 is available as a classic Formula One car in the "Special Edition" of the game or as downloadable content. It is available for free in the following F1 2018, F1 2019 and F1 2020 games.

The MP4/4 has been added to the mobile game Real Racing 3 Version 6.0 by Firemonkeys, an EA Studio in December 2017. The game is available for Apple iOS devices, Android Devices, Nvidia Shield, and Amazon.com Kindle Fire.

Complete Formula One results
(key)(results in bold indicate pole position, results in italics indicate fastest lap)

See also

Ayrton Senna
Alain Prost
Team McLaren
Honda Racing F1
Ron Dennis
Steve Nichols
1988 Formula One season

References

Bibliography

 
 
The Concise Encyclopedia of Formula One (1998) by David Tremayne.

External links

 https://nichols-cars.com/

McLaren MP4 04
Formula One championship-winning cars